Georges Corraface  (Giórgos Chorafás;) is a French actor of Greek descent, born on December 7, 1952 in  Paris, France.  He performed in film and television, following many years in French theatre, notably as a member of the International Center for Theatre Research under the direction of Peter Brook in the Peter Brook Company. His notable film credits include To Tama, Escape from L.A., La Pasión Turca, Vive La Mariée, Impromptu, Christopher Columbus, A Touch of Spice, and a feature film debut in The Mahabharata. His most popular television appearances include La Bicyclette Bleue, L'Été Rouge in France, The Young Indiana Jones Chronicles in the USA and Drifting Cities in Greece.

Biography
Georges Corraface is the son of the Greek symphonic and opera conductor, and violinist, Dimitri Chorafas, Cephalonian descendant of the Neapolitan Carafa family. His multi-cultural background enables him to work in French, Greek, English, Spanish, German and Italian, in roles ranging from dramatic leads to eccentric characterizations. He is most popular in France, Greece and Spain, by virtue of box office hits, best actor awards and television celebrity he enjoys in these countries. Corraface won The International Thessaloniki Thessaloniki Film Award in 1996 for Slaughter of the Cock and the State Award for Best Actor of the Year in 2001 for To Tama (Word of Honor). He was the president of the Thessaloniki International Film Festival from 2005-2010.

Returning to the stage in Paris, France in 2011, he created the role of Hook in Pan a musical adaptation of Peter Pan directed by Irina Brook. In 2012, Georges Corraface starred in British independent feature film Papadopoulos and sons in which he played the playful and larger-than-life "Uncle Spiros". The film was released in the UK through Cineworld on 5 April 2013.

In 2013, he wrote, directed and played in Burn Your House  in Paris a play based on a selection of works by Nikos Kazantzakis, he also joined the tour The Other Side of Greece, a series of concerts in Paris, Brussels, Athens, with Filippos Pliatsikas and Babis Stokas and a number of outstanding artists.

He received the Nova Award for International Achievement at the 2013 Hellenic Film Academy Awards.

He is currently pursuing his career as an actor, as well as branching out in the area of fiction and documentary film production.

He lives in Paris, France with his wife and writing partner Rosalie and their two children (Zoe Corraface, an actress/singer, and Ilya Chorafas, a documentary film-maker) and works in film, television, and theatre.

Selected credits

Films 

 S.A.S. à San Salvador (1983, by Raoul Coutard) - Luis
 The French Revolution (1989, by Robert Enrico and Richard Heffron) - Hébert
 The Mahabharata (1990, TV Mini-Series, by Peter Brook) - Duryodhana
 Not Without My Daughter (1991, by Brian Guilbert) - Mohsen
 Impromptu (1990, by James Lapine) - Felicien Mallefille
 My Daughter Belongs to Me (1991, by Vivian Naefe) - Nikos
 Christopher Columbus: The Discovery (1992, by John Glen) - Christopher Columbus
 La Pasión Turca (1994, by Vicente Aranda) - Yamán
 Quartet in Four Movements (1994, by Lucia Rikaki) - Antonis
 Mor, vida meva (1996, by Mar Targarona) - Jota Sansvolonté
 Escape from L.A. (1996, by John Carpenter) - Cuervo Jones
 The Slaughter of Cock (1996, by Andreas Pantzis) - Evagoras
 C'est la tangente que je préfère (1997, by Charlotte Silvera) - Jiri / theater director
 Minotaur (1997, by Jonathan Tamuz) - Nicos
 Long Live the Bride and the Liberation of Kurdistan (1997, by Hiner Saleem) .... Cheto
 Préférence (1998, by Grégoire Delacourt) - Max
 Algiers-Beirut: Remembrance (1998, by Merzak Allouache) - Rachid
 Peppermint (1999, by Kostas Kapakas) - Stefanos
 Km.0 (2000, by Juan Luis Iborra and Yolanda Garcia Serrano) - Gerardo
 Stand-by (2000, by Roch Stéphanik) - Le client dans le parking
 To Tama (World of Honor) (2001, by Andreas Pantzis) - Evagoras
 Reflejos (2002, by Miguel Angel Vivas) - Jaime
 Girls Can Get Away with Anything (2002, by Charlotte Silvera) - Le pompier
 A Touch of Spice (“Πολίτικη Κουζίνα”) (2003, by Tassos Boulmetis) - Fanis Iakovidis
 Chariton's Choir (I Horodia Tou Hariton) (2005, by Grigoris Karandinakis) - Chariton
 Camille des Lilas et les voleurs d'enfants (2005, by Jean-Louis Milesi) - Alain
 L'Ultimo Pulcinella (2008, by Maurizio Scaparro) - Commandant Richard
 Le Bal des Actrices (2009, by Maïwenn Le Besco) - Réalisateur Jeanne Balibar
 Dangerous Cooking (Epikindynes mageirikes) (2009, by Vassilis Tselemegos) - Damoklis
 The Prankster (2010, by Tony Vidal) - Nick Karas
 The Signature (2010, by Stelios Haralambopoulos) - Angelos Mavilis
 Without Borders (2011, by Nick Gaitatji) - Plato
 Papadopoulos & Sons (2012, by Marcus Markou) - Spiros Papadopoulos
 Joy and Sorrow of the Body (2013, by Andreas Pantzis) - Milen
 Family Harmony (2013, by Camille de Casabianca) - Jean
 The First Line (2014, by Coerte Voorhees, John Voorhees) - Michel
 Ursus (2015, by Otar Shamatava) - Jean-Pierre Jannaud
 Lolo (2015, by Julie Delpy) as Sakis
 Xamou (2016, by Clio Fanouraki) - Johnny
 Adults in the Room (2019, by Costa-Gavras) - Greek Ambassador France
 Super Hero, in spite of himself  (2020, by Philippe Lachau) as Alain Belmont
 Ghosts of the Revolution  (2020, by Thanos Anastopoulos) as Demetrio Carciotti

Television 

 Salut Champion, (1979), by Serge Friedman.
 The Bunker, (1980), by George Shaeffer.
 La Crêtoise, (1980), by Jean-Pierre Desagnat.
 Les Poneys Sauvages, (1982), by Robert Mazoyer.
 Two of Diamonds, (1984), by Bruno Gantillon.
 Drifting Cities (Cités à la dérive), (1884), by Robert Manthoulis.
 La Louve, (1987), by José Giovanni.
 War and Remembrance, (1988), by Dan Curtis.
 Fly By Night, (1991), by Bruno Gantillon.
 Navarro, (1991), by Patrick Jamain.
 Runaway Bay, (1991), by Jerry Mill.
 Inspector Morse, (1991), by Colin Gregg. As Claudio Battisti in Season 6, Episode 3: The Death of the Self
 Palace Guard, (1991), by George d'Amato.
 Le Petit Milliard, (1992), by Pierre Tchernia.
 The Young Indiana Jones Chronicles, (1992), by Mike Newell.
 Bambino Mio, (1993), by Edward Bennett.
 Le Château des oliviers, (1993), by Nicolas Gessner.
 Highlander (Saving Grace), (1993), by Ray Austin.
 The Scarlet and The Black, (1993), by Ben Bolt.
 Esperanza, (1994), by René Manzor.
 Barrage sur l'Orénoque, (1995), by Juan Buñuel.
 Strangers, (1995), by Eleanore Lindo.
 Une patronne de charme, (1996), by Bernard Uzan.
 Algiers-Beirut: A Souvenir, (1997), by Merzack Allouache.
 Only Love, (1998), by John Ermin.
 Winds of Passion" (Tramontane), (1998), by Henri Helman.
 Algiers-Beirut: Remembrance (1998, by Merzak Allouache) - Rachid
 Toutes les femmes sont des déesses, (1999), by Marion Sarraut.
 Femme d'Honneur, (1999), by Gilles Béhat.
 The Teacher, (2000), by Henri Helman.
 The Dispossessed (Les Déracinés), (2000), by Jacques Renard.
 The Blue Bicycle, (2000), by Thierry Binistri.
 L'Emmerdeuse, (2001), by Mickael Perrotta.
 Écoute, Nicolas, (2002), by Roger Kahane.
 The Red Summer, (2002), by Gérard Marx.
 Alex Santana, negotiator, (2002-2004), by José Pinheiro.
 Disparitions, (2008), by Bruno Gantillon and Robin Davis - 12 episodes.
 Les Amants de l'ombre, (2009), by Philippe Niang.
 Les Associés, (2009), by Alain Berliner.
 Enquêtes Réservées, (2011), by Laurent Carceles.
 Section de Recherches, (2012), by Eric Leroux.
 One dead man too many, (2014), by Philippe Niang.
 The Permission, (2014), by Philippe Niang.
 Death in Paradise, (2015), episode 4.3 by James O'Neill.
 Clem, (2017-2018), by [Elsa Bennett, Hippolyte Dard, Nicolas Herdt] as Antinio.
 Commissaire Magellan, (2019), by [Gregory Ecale] as Claude.

 Theatre 
 Burn your House directed by Georges Corraface at The Maison de la Poésie.
 PAN directed by Irina Brook at the Théâtre de Paris.
 The Mahabharata, by Jean-Claude Carrière, directed by Peter Brook. Avignon Theatre Festival and Théâtre des Bouffes du Nord, European & world tour.
 The Tempest, by William Shakespeare, directed by Peter Brook. Théâtre des Bouffes du Nord.
 Sur le Fil, (On The Tightrope) - by Fernando Arrabal, directed by Pierre Constant. Avignon Theatre Festival: world premiere.
 Sur le Fil, (second version) - by Fernando Arrabal, directed by Jorge Lavelli.
 Blood Wedding, by Federico García Lorca, directed by Telmo Herrera. Lucernaire Théâtre..
 Antony and Cleopatra, by William Shakespeare, directed by Michel Cacoyannis. Athens Festival, with Irène Papas.
 Phedra, directed by Antoine Vitez. Conservatoire National d'Art Dramatique.
 Much Ado About Nothing et Beatrice & Benedicte, by William Shakespeare, The Berlioz Opera, directed by Jean-Louis Thamin. Berlioz Festival in Lyon.
 Dialogue with Leuco, by César Pavese, directed by Antoine Bourseiller. Petit Théâtre de l'Odéon .
 In Memphis, There is a Man of Prodigious Power, by Jean Audureau, directed by Henri Ronse. Théâtre de l'Odéon with Tania Torrens.
 The Taming of the Shrew, by William Shakespeare, directed by Gérard Le Breton, at the Shakespeare Festival. Georges Corraface as Petrucchio..
 The Merchant of Venice, by William Shakespeare, directed by Marcelle Tassencourt. Théâtre Édouard VII & tournée. Georges Corraface as Bassanio.
 The Just, by Albert Camus, directed by Marcelle Tassencourt
 Springtime Awakening, by Frank Wedekind, directed by Pierre Romain. Grasse Theatre Festival.
 Le Bleu du ciel, by Georges Bataille, directed by Serge Martin. Théâtre Malakoff à Rennes.
 Play It Again, Sam, by Woody Allen, directed by Bob Hranichny.
 The Sword and the Rose (La Rose et le Fer), by Patrick Schmitt.
 Hello Out There, by William Sarroyan, directed by Marcelle Tassencourt.

 Producer 

 Word of Honor (2001) Associate Producer. 
 Chariton’s Choir (2005) Associate Producer. 
 The Signature (I Ypografi) (2011) Associate Producer.
 Adespota: Stray Dogs in the Heart of Athens (2013) Producer. 
 The First Line (2014) Associate Producer. 
 Xa Mou'' (2016) Associate Producer.

Notes

References

External links 

Official site

Georges Corraface at Entertainment Creative Interface (ECI) Global Talent Management

1952 births
Greek male film actors
French male film actors
French people of Greek descent
French male television actors
Living people
Male actors from Paris
French male stage actors
20th-century French male actors
21st-century French male actors